Pierre Michel Delaporte (5 September 1806 – 30 September 1872) was a 19th-century French playwright, painter, lithographer and political caricaturist.

Short biography 
He was educated in Amiens and in 1824 became a student of Jean-Baptiste Regnault. After he suffered from an eye disease, he was forced to give up painting and thus turned to writing.

His plays were presented on the most important Parisian stages of the 19th century including the Théâtre des Folies-Dramatiques, the Théâtre du Palais-Royal, and the Théâtre des Variétés.

He also created numerous lithographies, illustrations and prints which were published in many newspapers and magazines, such as La Caricature (1830–1843) or Le Figaro.

Works 

 La Fille de l'air dans son ménage, vaudeville-féerie in 1 act, with Honoré, 1837
 Le Cousin du Pérou, comédie-vaudeville in 2 acts, with Lubize and Théodore Muret, 1837
 Le Parisien, comédie-vaudeville in 1 act, 1837
 Argentine, comedy in 2 acts, mingled with couplets, with Charles Dupeuty and Gabriel de Lurieu, 1839
 L'Amour d'un ouvrier, drame-vaudeville in 2 acts, with Hippolyte Lévesque, 1839
 La Bergère d'Ivry, drame-vaudeville in 5 acts, with de Lurieu, 1839
 L'Argent, la gloire et les femmes, vaudeville extravaganza, in 4 acts and 5 tableaux, with the Cogniard brothers, 1840
 L'Andalouse de Paris, vaudeville in 1 act, with Louis Bergeron, 1840
 La Mère Godichon, vaudeville in 3 acts, with Lubize, 1840
 Job l'afficheur, vaudeville in 2 acts, with the Cogniard brothers, 1840
 Pile ou face, vaudeville in 2 acts, with Lubize, 1840
 Les Amours de Psyché, fantasie play, mingled with song, in 3 acts and 10 tableaux; preceded by l'Olympe, prologue, with Charles Dupeuty, 1841
 Un Premier ténor, folie-vaudeville in 1 act, 1841
 Les Comédiens et les marionnettes, vaudeville in 2 acts, with Dupeuty, 1842
 Un Ménage de garçon, comédie-vaudeville in 1 act, with Laurençot, 1842
 Colin-Tampon, vaudeville in 1 act, with Adolphe d'Ennery, 1844
 Estelle et Némorin, pastorale bouffonne in 2 acts, mingled with songs, with Charles Potier, 1844
 Un Tribunal de femmes, vaudeville in 1 act, with Laurençot, 1844
 Le Diable à quatre, vaudeville-féerie in 3 acts, with Ernest Jaime, 1845
 Les Amours de Monsieur et Madame Denis, comédie vaudeville in 2 acts, with Auguste Anicet-Bourgeois, 1845
 Cabrion ! ou les Infortunes de Pipelet, folie-vaudeville in 1 act, 1845
 La Fille à Nicolas, comédie-vaudeville in 3 acts, with Laurençot, 1845
 La Samaritaine, vaudeville in 1 act, with de Lurieu, 1845
 Henri IV, drame historique in 3 acts, 16 tableaux and prologue, with Amable de Saint-Hilaire, 1846
 La Nouvelle Héloïse, drama in 3 acts, mingled with song, with Jacques-François Ancelot, 1846
 Ah ! que l'amour est agréable !, vaudeville in 5 tableaux, with Hippolyte-Jules Demolière and Charles Henri Ladislas Laurençot, 1847
 Les Femmes de Paris, ou l'Homme de loisir, drama in 5 acts, in prose, preceded by Un duel sans témoins, prologue, with Virginie Ancelot, 1848
 Chodruc-Duclos, ou l'Homme à la longue barbe, melodrama in 5 acts and 8 tableaux, with Alphonse Royer and Gustave Vaez, 1850
 L'Île des bêtises, vaudeville-revue of the year 1849, in 3 acts and 5 tableaux, with Honoré, 1850
 Le Raisin malade, folie fantastique in 1 act, mingled with couplets, 1850
 Les Quenouilles de verre, féerie-vaudeville in 3 acts and 8 tableaux, with Maurice Alhoy, 1851
 La Femme de ménage, ou la Tabatière de Polichinelle, vaudeville in 1 act, 1851
 La Course au plaisir, revue de 1851, in 2 acts and 3 tableaux, with Gaston de Montheau and Théodore Muret, 1851
 Les Reines des bals publics, folie-vaudeville in 1 act, with de Montheau, 1852
 La Fille de Madame Grégoire, vaudeville in 1 act, with de Montheau, 1853
 Un Moyen dangereux, comedy in 1 act, mingled with song, with Jean-François-Alfred Bayard, 1854
 Les Papillons et la chandelle, vaudeville in 1 act, 1854
 Le Bois de Boulogne, revue-féerique, mingled with couplets, in 2 acts and 5 tableaux, with Paul Duport, 1855
 Le Cousin du Roi, comedy in 2 acts, mingled with couplets, with Laurencin, 1855
 Toinette et son carabinier, croquis musical in 1 act, 1856
 Le Billet de faveur, comédie-vaudevilles in 3 acts, with Laurecin and Eugène Cormon, 1856
 Le Marquis d'Argentcourt, comédie-vaudeville in 3 acts, with Dupeuty, 1857
 Rose la fruitière, vaudeville in 3 acts, 1857
 Méphistophélès, saynète musicale, 1858
 La Nouvelle Hermione, comedy mingled with couplets, in 1 act, with Laurencin, 1858
 Il n'y a plus de grisettes !, vaudeville in 1 act, with Laurencin, 1859
 Le Masque de velours, vaudeville in 2 acts, 1859
 Les Trois fils de Cadet-Roussel, comédie-vaudeville in 3 acts, with Laurencin and Charles Varin, 1860
 Ah ! Que l'amour est agréable !, vaudeville in 5 acts, with Varin, 1860
 Un Hercule et une jolie femme, vaudeville in 1 act, with Varin, 1861
 Ma sœur Mirette, comedy in 2 acts, mingled with song, with Varin, 1861
 L'Auteur de la pièce, comédie-vaudeville in 1 act, with Varin, 1862
 Monsieur et Madame Denis, opéra comique in 1 act, with Laurencin, music by Jacques Offenbach, 1862
 La Comtesse Mimi, comedy in 3 acts, with Varin, 1862
 Un Ténor pour tout faire !, opérette in 1 act, with Varin, 1863
 Une Femme qui bat son gendre, comédie-vaudeville in 1 act, with Varin, 1864
 Une Femme, un melon et un horloger !, vaudeville in 1 act, with Varin, 1864
 Les Ficelles de Montempoivre, vaudeville in 3 acts, with Varin, 1864
 Les Filles mal gardées, comedy in 3 acts, with Varin, 1865
 Le Sommeil de l'innocence, comédie-vaudeville in 1 act, with Varin, 1865
 La Bande noire, drama in 7 acts, with Paul Foucher and Auguste Delaporte, 1866
 Le Baudet perdu, paysannerie in 1 act, with Varin, 1866
 Madame Ajax, play in 3 acts, with Varin, 1866
 L'Ange de mes rêves !, vaudeville in 3 acts, with Varin, 1867
 Ces Scélérates de bonnes, vaudeville in 3 acts, with Laurencin, 1867
 La Dame aux giroflées, comédie-vaudeville in 1 act, with Varin, 1867
 Le Dernier des Gaillard, vaudeville in 1 act, with Varin, 1867
 Madame Pot-au-feu, comédie-vaudeville in 1 act, with Varin, 1869

 Bibliography 
 Jules Gay, Bibliographie des ouvrages relatifs à l'amour, aux femmes, au mariage..., 1871, (p. 447-448)
 Gustave Vapereau, Dictionnaire universel des contemporains, 1880, (p. 536)
 Charles Dezobry, Théodore Bachelet, Dictionnaire général de biographie et d'histoire'', 1895, (p. 811)

References 

19th-century French dramatists and playwrights
19th-century French painters
French male painters
French lithographers
French caricaturists
Painters from Paris
1806 births
1872 deaths
19th-century French male artists